These are the results of the women's uneven bars competition, one of five events for female competitors of the artistic gymnastics discipline contested in the gymnastics at the 2010 Summer Youth Olympics in Singapore. The qualification and final rounds took place on August 17 at the Bishan Sports Hall.

Medalists

Results

Qualification

41 gymnasts competed in the uneven bars event in the artistic gymnastics qualification round on August 17.
The eight highest scoring gymnasts advanced to the final on August 21.

Final

References

Gymnastics at the 2010 Summer Youth Olympics
Women's sports competitions in Singapore
2010 in women's gymnastics